In comics, Elementals may refer to:

 Elementals (Comico Comics), a superhero comic book by Bill Willingham
 Elementals (Marvel Comics), a group of four immortals in the Marvel Universe

It may also refer to:
 Element Girl
 Element Lad

See also
Elemental (disambiguation)